David or Davy Jacobs may refer to:

David Jacobs (broadcaster) (1926–2013), BBC radio and television presenter and actor
David Jacobs (cricketer, born 1989), South African cricketer
David Jacobs (gymnast), American gymnast
David Jacobs (Ontario politician), Canadian lawyer and politician
David Jacobs (sociologist), American sociologist
David Jacobs (steroid dealer) (c. 1973–2008), American personal trainer, convicted steroid dealer and informant, son of David Jacobs (gymnast)
David Jacobs (table tennis) (born 1977), Paralympic competitor from Indonesia
David Jacobs (Welsh athlete) (1888–1976), Olympic gold-medallist from Wales
David Jacobs (writer) (born 1939), American creator/writer of the television series Dallas and Knots Landing
David Anthony Jacobs, Baron Jacobs (1931–2014), British businessman and Liberal Democrat politician
David M. Jacobs (born 1942), American UFO and abduction phenomenon researcher
Davy Jacobs (born 1982), South African cricketer

See also
David Jacob Eisenhower (1863–1942), father of United States President Dwight D. Eisenhower